Creative computing covers the interdisciplinary area at the cross-over of the creative arts and computing. Issues of creativity include knowledge discovery, for example.

Overview
The International Journal of Creative Computing describes creative computing as follows:

Creative computing is interdisciplinary in nature and topics relating to it include applications, development method, evaluation, modeling, philosophy, principles, support environment, and theory.

The term "creative computing" is used both in the United Kingdom and the United States (e.g., at Harvard University and MIT).

Degree programmes
A number of university degree (Bachelor's degree) programmes in Creative Computing exist, for example at:
 University of the Arts London
 Queen's University
 University of West London
 St. Pölten University of Applied Sciences
 Bath Spa University
 Falmouth University
 Goldsmiths, University of London
 Queen Mary, University of London
 Wrexham Glyndŵr University
 Dún Laoghaire Institute of Art, Design and Technology 
 Leeds Beckett University, the programme is named as BSc (Hons) Creative Media Technology 
 University of Portsmouth, the programme is named as BSc (Hons) Creative Media Technologies 
 City University of Hong Kong, the programme is named as Bachelor of Science in Creative Media, jointly offered by the School of Creative Media and the Department of Computer Science
 Technological and Higher Education Institute of Hong Kong, the programme is named as Bachelor of Science (Honours) Multimedia Technology and Innovation
 Hong Kong Metropolitan University, the programme is named as Bachelor of Arts with Honours in Computing and Interactive Entertainment
 Caritas Institute of Higher Education, the programme is named as Bachelor of Science (Honours) in Digital Entertainment Technology
Master's degree programmes:
 City University of Hong Kong, the programme is named as Master of Arts in Creative Media (MACM)
 Hong Kong Polytechnic University, the programme is named as Multimedia & Entertainment Technology (MSc)
 The Hong Kong University of Science and Technology, the programme is named as Master of Philosophy and Doctor of Philosophy Programs in Computational Media and Arts

Journal

The International Journal of Creative Computing is a quarterly peer-reviewed scientific journal published by Inderscience Publishers, covering creativity in computing and the other way around. The editor-in-chief is Andy M. Connor  (Auckland University of Technology).

The journal was established in 2013 and is abstracted and indexed in CSA, ProQuest, and DBLP databases. The journal is currently in the process of recruiting a new Editorial Board for re-launch in 2021.

See also 
 Creative coding
 Computer art

References

Creativity techniques
Subfields of computer science